Jayhun District (before 2016: Qumsangir District) is a district in Khatlon Region, Tajikistan. Its capital is the town Dusti. The population of the district is 139,000 (January 2020 estimate).

During part of the Soviet period the district was named Molotovobod District.

Administrative divisions
They are as follows:

References

Districts of Khatlon Region
Districts of Tajikistan